Rajamadam is a village in the Pattukkottai taluk of Thanjavur district, Tamil Nadu, India. Rajamadam to Adirampattinam 6 km  distance from its Taluk Main Town Pattukkottai 15 km . Rajamadam is 58.1 km distant from its District Main City Thanjavur and 320 km distance from its State Main City Chennai.It is the birth place of former President of India and independence activist R Venkitaraman.

Etymology 

The name Rajamadam came from the Tamil words raja and madam. Raja denotes king Saraboji II, who created this village. Madam denotes the shelter or Chattram or Madam built by him. There is a Madam still standing in this village with a portrait of King Saraboji II, which is the standing proof for the name of the village.

History 

King Saraboji II built many Madams in Tanjavur district. Some of them are Rajamadam, Sethubava Chatram, Ammani Chatram etc., for the travellers who are travelling in and around Tanjavur. While constructing a Madam, he also created villages to support the particular Madam. So in year 1889 he built the Rajamadam village along with the Madam. He created Agraharam where he relocated Brahmins and he created four main streets, one for each direction surrounding the Agraharam. They are namely Keezhatheru(East Street), Melatheru (West Street), Vadaku theru (North Street) and Therku theru (South Street). Also he constructed two temples in each end of the Agraharam. They were Sri Rajagopala Swamy temple and Sri Kasi Viswanatha Swamy temple. Now there was some space remaining after the construction of Sri Rajagopala Swamy temple. He created a street out of it and he named it Otha Agraharam (Brahmin Houses on only one side of the street). He also constructed village deities for each street. They included Kali Amman Temple, Thachi Amman Temple, and Ganesh Temple. He also constructed various ponds to support the people of this village. They were Chatrakulam (Pond of Madam) which was used by the Agraharam people, travellers and crew of Madam. Then BavaKulam named after one of his Wife Sethu Bava was constructed for the North Street. Prakulam was constructed for the South Street. Senkankulam was constructed for East Street and Mocha Kulam for West Street. Agriculture started flourishing with the water taken from these ponds as well as the Agniyar River, a tributary of Cauvery. This is the way the village was constructed along with Madam.

Demographics 

As per the 2001 census, Rajamadam had a total population of 2304 with 1147 males and 1157 females. The sex ratio was 1009. The literacy rate was 60.95.

Notable People 
R. Venkataraman - 8th President of India

Rajamadam Kannan Iyengar - The Karnam of Karnams 

Suratha - The Uvamai Kavigyar (Tamil Poet)

See also 
R. Venkataraman
Suratha
Sri Rajagopala Swamy temple
Anna University Campus

References 

 

Villages in Thanjavur district